Jaspar Yu Woon Chai (born November 14, 1988) is a Bruneian badminton player. He achieved a career high ranking of 199 in the men's singles discipline.

It was announced in May 2016 that he was awarded the tripartite commission to compete in the men's singles event at the 2016 Summer Olympics in Rio de Janeiro, Brazil. Yu was the first badminton athlete from Brunei to compete at the Olympics.

Career
Jaspar has made a few Superseries appearances at the international stage. In 2019, alongside his partner Ahmad Mahyuddin Haji Abas, they qualified to the main draw of the Badminton Asia Championships after winning the group tie in group B but lost to the eventual bronze medalists Kang Min-hyuk and Kim Won-ho in the first round.

He made his debut at the 2016 Summer Olympics.

References

External links
Tournament Software
 Tournament Software Player Profile website

Badminton World Federation
 Player Profile website
 BWF World Ranking website

Living people
1988 births
People from Kinmen County
Bruneian male badminton players
Bruneian people of Chinese descent
Badminton players at the 2016 Summer Olympics
Olympic badminton players of Brunei
Competitors at the 2017 Southeast Asian Games
Southeast Asian Games competitors for Brunei